Johnny Baseball: The New Red Sox Musical is a musical with a book by Richard Dresser and a score by brothers Robert Reale and Willie Reale.  The story involves circumstances relating to the Curse of the Bambino.  The musical had a preview run in Massachusetts that began on May 14, 2010. The musical's world premiere was on June 2, 2010 at the Loeb Drama Center of the American Repertory Theater.

Synopsis

Originally called Red Sox Nation, Johnny Baseball was conceived after the Red Sox's stunning collapse in the 2003 playoffs due to the "Curse", which is often cited as a reason for the failure of the Boston Red Sox baseball team to win the World Series in the 86-year period from 1918 until 2004.

The Curse is traced to the interactions of three people: the fictional Johnny O'Brien, a hard-luck right-hander on the 1919  Red Sox; his idol, Babe Ruth; and O'Brien's love interest, Daisy Wyatt, an African American blues singer. The show is told through flashbacks between the fourth game of the 2004 American League Championship Series and the fictional life of Johnny O'Brien. The musical ends with David Ortiz ending the Curse in 2004.

Original production numbers 
Source: CurtainUp, UMaine program

Act I
Overture
Eighty-Six Years
Ballad of Johnny O'Brien
All I Have to Do
God Bless the Boston Red Sox
Don't I Know You?
Brotherhood of Bastards
Rooters' Song (removed in Maine production)
Maybe You're An Angel (replaced with "God Wouldn't Mind" in Maine production)
Ballad of Johnny O'Brien (Reprise)
Auto Strop Jingle (removed in Maine production)
Daisy Darling Why (removed in Maine production)
Do or Die (removed in Maine production)
Johnny Baseball Has A Vision (new in Maine production)
Color Me Blue
As Long As There's a Chance

Act II
Entr'acte
Not Rivera
One More Run
Daisy's Letter
Worcester Booster's Fight Song
Circle in a Diamond
Free Country (removed in Maine production)
One More Run (Reprise)
Mr. Yawkey Has a Vision
All I Have to Do (Reprise)
See You in the Big Leagues
Errors
The Game of Baseball

Production history 
The premiere production was staged at the American Repertory Theater in Cambridge, Massachusetts. The cast featured Colin Donnell as the fictional character Johnny O'Brien, Stephanie Umoh as the fictional character Daisy Wyatt, Burke Moses as Babe Ruth, Charl Brown as Tim, and Jeff Brooks as Tom Yawkey.

The creative team included direction by Diane Paulus, choreography by Peter Pucci, orchestrations by Wendy Bobbitt Cavett, costumes by Michael McDonald, sets by Scott Pask, and lighting by Donald Holder. This production played from June 2, 2010 to July 11, 2010. Johnny Baseball was part of the theater's America: Boom, Bust and Baseball festival.

It was next produced in August, 2012 by the University of Maine Summer Music Theatre Festival and Issaquah, Washington-based Village Theatre's Festival of New Musicals.

After heavy rewrites, it was produced for the Williamstown Theatre Festival in Summer 2013.

Awards and nominations

Elliot Norton Award 
Outstanding Director (Large Theater) (Diane Paulus) WINNER

Independent Reviewers of New England (IRNE) Awards 
Best Musical (A.R.T.) Nominated
Best Director of a Musical (Diane Paulus) Nominated
Best Supporting Actor Musical (Burke Moses) Nominated
Best Actress Musical (Stephanie Umoh) Nominated
Best Young Performer (Erik March) Nominated

References

External links 
Theater Mania page

2010 musicals